The National Association of Volunteer Motor Transport Corps Medal of Merit (FAKGM/SM) is a Swedish medal awarded by the National Association of Volunteer Motor Transport Corps (FAK) for meritorious work and good personal efforts within FAK's area of activity or within activities particularly benefiting the FAK.

History
The medal was established in 1934 as the Swedish Voluntary Motor Transport Corps Merit Badge (FAKFt). In 1948, the medal change name to Swedish Voluntary Motor Transport Corps Medal of Merit (FAKg). In 1958, it became the National Association of Volunteer Motor Transport Corps Medal of Merit (FAKGM/SM).

Appearance

Medal
The medal of merit in gold (gilded silver) and in silver, is minted in the eighth size in oval shape and bears on the obverse His Majesty the King's image crowned by the royal crown and on the front FAK's mirror monogram and the inscription "To N.N. for merits of the Voluntary Motor Transport Corps" and the year of awarding.

Ribbon
Divided in yellow, blue and yellow moiré.

Criteria
The national chief of the corps decides on the award with the support of His Majesty the King's gracious consent.

Gold
 to an individual, the one who through personal effort in a particularly meritorious way has benefited the FAK through particularly fruitful work for as a rule at least 15 years.
 to foreign nationals as the highest honor that the FAK can award for merits of the FAK.

Silver
 to an individual, who through personal effort has benefited the FAK through extremely profitable activities for as a rule at least 10 years.

Presenting
In addition to the national chief of the corps, the deputy national chief of the corps, the members of the national corps board and union boards have the right to make proposals regarding the awarding of the award. An individual member has the right to submit to the union chief in his or her own union a proposal for the award of the award in accordance with regulations issued by the union board.

Awards must be handed over to the recipient in solemn forms - for example at the national assembly or the union assembly.

Wearing
The gold and silver medals are worn on the left side of the chest in a vertically divided yellow-blue-yellow ribbon.

See also
National Association of Volunteer Motor Transport Corps Merit Badge

Footnotes

References

Notes

Print

Orders, decorations, and medals of Sweden
Awards established in 1934
1934 establishments in Sweden